The 1953–54 Rugby Union County Championship was the 54th edition of England's premier rugby union club competition at the time.

Middlesex won the competition for the third time after defeating Lancashire in the final. Higgins was carried off on a stretcher early in the game which contributed to the heavy loss suffered by Lancashire.

Final

See also
 English rugby union system
 Rugby union in England

References

Rugby Union County Championship
County Championship (rugby union) seasons